Martin Bojowald (born 18 February 1973 in Jülich) is a German physicist who now works on the faculty of the Penn State Physics Department, where he is a member of the Institute for Gravitation and the Cosmos. Prior to joining Penn State he spent several years at the Max Planck Institute for Gravitational Physics in Potsdam, Germany. He works on loop quantum gravity and physical cosmology and is credited with establishing the sub-field of loop quantum cosmology.

Positions 
 Presently: Professor of Physics, The Pennsylvania State University, Institute for Gravitation and the Cosmos
 January 2006 - June 2009: Assistant Professor of Physics, The Pennsylvania State University, Institute for Gravitation and the Cosmos
 September 2003 - December 2005: Junior Staff Scientist, Albert-Einstein-Institut
 September 2000 - August 2003: Postdoctoral Scholar, Center for Gravitational Physics and Geometry, The Pennsylvania State University

Education 
 June 2000: PhD at RWTH Aachen in Germany (with distinction), supervisor: Prof. Hans A. Kastrup
 July 1998 - August 2000: Fellow of the DFG-Graduate College "Strong and electroweak interactions at high energies"
 June 1998: Diploma, RWTH Aachen (with distinction), supervisor: Prof. Dr. Hans A. Kastrup
 April 1995 - June 1998: Fellow of the German Merit Foundation
 October 1993 - June 2000: RWTH Aachen

Prizes and awards 
 Faculty Scholar Medal in the Physical Sciences 2011, Penn State University
 Teaching Award 2009, Penn State Society of Physics Students
 NSF CAREER AWARD 2008: "Effective Descriptions in Cosmology"
 Xanthopoulos Prize 2007 of the International Society on General Relativity and Gravitation
 Selected for a portrait in Nature, January 2005
 First Award, Gravity Research Foundation Essay Competition, 2003

See also 
List of loop quantum gravity researchers
Big Bounce
Abhay Ashtekar

References

External links
 Loop Quantum Cosmology
  Later edition of the above article
 Absence of Singularity in Loop Quantum Cosmology
 Publications at ArXiv
 an interview published in Nature
 Glimpse of Time Before Big Bang Possible by Charles Q. Choi. Article on Space.com using Bojowald as authority. July 1, 2007. Retrieved July 2, 2007.

German relativity theorists
Loop quantum gravity researchers
German cosmologists
Living people
Place of birth missing (living people)
1973 births